James Merriman (born 17 January 1984) is a Welsh rugby union footballer for Bristol Rugby. A flanker, he has captained the Wales Under-21 side and has played for the Wales Sevens team. He was part of the Wales Sevens team that won the 2009 Rugby World Cup Sevens.

External links
 Bristol Rugby profile
 Llandovery College

Welsh rugby union players
Bristol Bears players
Neath RFC players
1984 births
Living people
Rugby sevens players at the 2006 Commonwealth Games
Commonwealth Games rugby sevens players of Wales